Robert Malcolm "Bob" Harper (17 November 1944 – 2 November 2017) was an Australian politician. He was a Member of the Queensland Legislative Assembly.

Early life 
Harper was born in Brisbane, and worked as an accountant before entering politics.

Politics 
Harper was a Liberal Party branch chairman, secretary and treasurer. In 1995 he was elected to the Queensland Legislative Assembly as the Liberal member for Mount Ommaney. Appointed Parliamentary Secretary to the Treasurer and Arts Minister in 1997, he lost his seat to a Labor candidate in 1998.

Later life 
Harper died on 2 November 2017. His funeral was held at St Catherine's Anglican Church, Middle Park, Brisbane on Friday 10 November 2017 and was buried that day at Centenary Memorial Gardens in Sumner.

References

1944 births
2017 deaths
Liberal Party of Australia members of the Parliament of Queensland
Members of the Queensland Legislative Assembly
Politicians from Brisbane